Darrion Daniels (born December 4, 1997) is an American football defensive end for the Birmingham Stallions of the United States Football League (USFL). He was signed by the San Francisco 49ers as an undrafted free agent in 2020 following his college football career with the Nebraska Cornhuskers. He also played for the Oklahoma State Cowboys in college.

College career
Daniels was a four-star prospect coming out of Bishop Dunne and committed to the Oklahoma State Cowboys on January 30, 2015. He was named Oklahoma State's most outstanding defensive newcomer in 2015. In 2018, Daniels transferred to Nebraska, where he played with his brother Damion. Daniels was a team captain in 2019 and an honorable mention all-Big Ten player.

Professional career

San Francisco 49ers
Daniels signed with the San Francisco 49ers as an undrafted free agent following the 2020 NFL Draft on April 28, 2020. He was waived during final roster cuts on September 5, 2020, and signed to the team's practice squad the next day. He was elevated to the active roster on October 17, November 28, and December 12 for the team's weeks 6, 12, and 14 games, against the Los Angeles Rams twice and Washington Football Team, and reverted to the practice squad after each game. He was promoted to the active roster on December 25.

On August 31, 2021, Daniels was waived by the 49ers and re-signed to the practice squad the next day.

Atlanta Falcons
Daniels signed with the Atlanta Falcons on July 27, 2022. He was waived on August 30.

Birmingham Stallions
Daniels signed with the Birmingham Stallions of the USFL on December 16, 2022.

References

External links
Nebraska Cornhuskers bio
San Francisco 49ers bio

1997 births
Living people
American football defensive tackles
Nebraska Cornhuskers football players
San Francisco 49ers players
Players of American football from Dallas
African-American players of American football
Oklahoma State Cowboys football players
21st-century African-American sportspeople
Atlanta Falcons players
Birmingham Stallions (2022) players